Shree Venkateshwara Hi-Tech Engineering College, also called SVHEC located at Gobichettipalayam, in Erode District in the state of Tamil Nadu, India is a private self-financing engineering institute. The college is approved by AICTE and is affiliated to the Anna University Coimbatore. The college was established in the academic year 2008–2009.

Courses offered
The college offers three courses leading to the Degree of Bachelor of Engineering (B.E.) and one course leading to Bachelor of Technology (B.Tech.) of the Anna University Coimbatore

UG Programmes 
B.E.
Electrical and Electronics Engineering
Electronics and Communication Engineering
Computer Science Engineering
Mechanical Engineering
Civil Engineering

B.Tech
Information Technology

PG Programmes
 Master of Business Administration
M.E.
 Applied Electronics
 Computer Science Engineering
 Manufacturing Engineering

Admission procedure
The Undergraduate students are admitted based on their 12th standard (higher secondary school) scores. The admissions are done as per the Government of Tamil Nadu norms through State Government Counselling (TNEA) and through regulated management seat procedures.

External links
 Anna University - College Files.

All India Council for Technical Education
Private engineering colleges in Tamil Nadu
Colleges affiliated to Anna University
Universities and colleges in Erode district
Education in Gobichettipalayam
Educational institutions established in 2008
2008 establishments in Tamil Nadu